The Treaty of Lake Poygan arranged for the sale of  of Menominee Native American lands in Wisconsin to the government of the United States for $350,000 plus  in Crow Wing County, Minnesota, west of the upper Mississippi River, to which the Menominee were asked to move. It was negotiated on October 18, 1848 at Lake Poygan, near Winneconne, Wisconsin.

Most provisions of the treaty were not carried out, as in 1852 Chief Oshkosh persuaded President Millard Fillmore to permit the tribe to remain on its Wolf River lands in Wisconsin.  Some 2,500 Menominee had refused to relocate west to Minnesota. The Menominee Indian Tribe of Wisconsin is federally recognized.

Sources
The Menominee Indian Tribe of Wisconsin
Wisconsin Historical Society

Notes

Native American history of Wisconsin
Lake Poygan
Native American history of Minnesota
1848 in Wisconsin